Double vision refers to diplopia, the perception of two images from a single object.

Double vision may also refer to:

Film and television 
 Double Vision (1971 film), a short film by  Peter Campus
 Double Vision (1992 film), a television film directed by Robert Knights
 Double Vision (2002 film), a film directed by Chen Kuo-fu
 Double Vision (company), a Malaysian TV production company
 "Double Vision" (Johnny Bravo), a 2004 episode of Johnny Bravo
 Double Vision, a 1993–96 Cartoon Network programming block

Literature 
 Double Vision (novel), a 2003 novel by Pat Barker
 Double Vision, a 2004 novel by George Garrett
 Double Vision, a 2005 novel by Tricia Sullivan

Music 
 Double Vision (band), Spanish eurodance duo group  
 Double Vision (Bob James and David Sanborn album), 1986
 Double Vision (Bonfire album), 2007
 Double Vision (video), 2007
 Double Vision (Foreigner album), 1978
 "Double Vision" (Foreigner song), the title song
 "Double Vision" (3OH!3 song), 2010
 Double Vision (Prince Royce album), 2015

See also 
 Seeing Double (disambiguation)